Cole Sand (born May 24, 2003) is an American actor. He played Nelson in the Disney Channel show Austin & Ally and Jensen in the NBC comedy-drama Parenthood and is the voice of Eli Pepperjack in DreamWorks' Tales of Arcadia. His two brothers, Jadon and Carter, are also actors. Sand is arguably best known for appearing in an 2013 commercial advertising the Nintendo Wii U game console, in which he speaks the line "hot buttered popcorn, that's a deal!".

Filmography

Films

Television

References

External links
 

21st-century American male actors
American male child actors
Place of birth missing (living people)
American male television actors
Living people
2003 births